The R556 is a Regional Route in South Africa. Its north-western terminus is in Sun City, North West from where the road is designated the R556 and abruptly changes direction, heading south-east towards Pretoria. The R556 head south-south-east ending at the R104 in Rustenburg

References

Regional Routes in North West (South African province)